Louis-Charles Thouin is a Canadian politician, who was elected to the National Assembly of Quebec in the 2018 provincial election. On March 30, 2021, he withdrew from the CAQ caucus amid an ethics probe. He represents the electoral district of Rousseau as an member of the Coalition Avenir Québec after being elected in the 2022 Quebec general election.

References

Living people
Coalition Avenir Québec MNAs
21st-century Canadian politicians
People from Lanaudière
Year of birth missing (living people)
Politicians affected by a party expulsion process